John Wyly (1367 - 1400) was a verderer and the member of the Parliament of England for Marlborough for the parliaments of February and September 1388.

References 

Members of Parliament for Marlborough
English MPs February 1388
Year of birth unknown
1400 deaths
English MPs September 1388
1367 births